The 2019–20 UCLA Bruins men's basketball team represented the University of California, Los Angeles, during the 2019–20 NCAA Division I season. The Bruins were led by first-year head coach Mick Cronin and played their home games at Pauley Pavilion as members in the Pac-12 Conference. UCLA finished the season with a 19–12 record. After starting slowly at 8–9, they went 11–3 and finished second in the Pac-12 at 12–6. Cronin was named the Pac-12 Coach of the Year, while junior Chris Smith earned first-team All-Pac-12 honors and was voted the Pac-12 Most Improved Player. Due to the coronavirus pandemic, the Pac-12 tournament was canceled before the Bruins' first scheduled game in the quarterfinals, and the NCAA tournament was called off as well.

UCLA started the season 7–6 in non-conference play, including home losses to mid-major programs Hofstra and Cal State Fullerton. After beginning 1–3 in the Pac-12, they won seven of their next nine, including an upset win on the road against Arizona followed by consecutive 12-point second-half comebacks against Washington State and Washington. Still, the Bruins needed a strong finish to offset their early-season struggles and become contenders for an NCAA tournament bid. Their late-season surge continued with their fifth straight win, defeating No. 18 Colorado on the road to sweep the season series. UCLA erased a nine-point deficit in the second half with a 14–0 run and recorded 14 deflections in the final 13 minutes against the Buffaloes, which largely contributed to the Bruins' rise up 25 spots that week to No. 76 on the NCAA Evaluation Tool, one metric used by the NCAA tourney selection committee. UCLA extended its winning streak to seven after home wins against Arizona State and Arizona. It was the Bruins' first regular season sweep in their rivalry with the Wildcats since 2012–13. In their regular-season finale, UCLA lost 54–52 at USC after the Trojans made a game-winning three-point field goal with one second remaining. The Bruins earned a No. 2 seed and a first-round bye in the Pac-12 Tournament. On March 12, the Pac-12 canceled the tournament prior to its quarterfinals due to the coronavirus pandemic, and the NCAA Tournament was canceled later that day as well.

UCLA's roster consisted of mostly role players. For the first time since 1977–78, it did not include a McDonald's All-American; the honor began in 1977. The team's most high-profile player—Shareef O'Neal, the son of Hall of Fame player Shaquille O'Neal—transferred midseason after failing to earn regular playing time. Smith, who averaged 13.1 points per game, was the only Bruin to average in double figures.

Previous season

The Bruins finished the 2018–19 season 17–16, 9–9 in Pac-12 play. They were led by sixth-year head coach Steve Alford until he was fired mid-season and assistant Murry Bartow was named the interim head coach. Their lineup featured three former McDonald's All-Americans: sophomores Jaylen Hands and Kris Wilkes were both named second-team All-Pac-12, while first-year player Moses Brown was voted to the Pac-12 All-Freshman Team. UCLA finished the season 17–16, and lost in the second round of the Pac-12 tournament. They missed the postseason for the second time in four years.

Off-season

Departures

2019 recruiting class

Roster

Schedule and results

|-
!colspan=12 style=| Exhibition

|-
!colspan=12 style=| Non–conference regular season

|-
!colspan=12 style=|  Pac-12 regular season

|-
!colspan=12 style=|  Pac-12 Tournament
|- style="background:#bbbbbb"
| style="text-align:center"|March 12, 20206:00 pm, P12N
| style="text-align:center"| (2)
| vs. (10) CaliforniaQuarterfinals
| colspan=5 rowspan=1 style="text-align:center"|Cancelled due to the COVID-19 pandemic
| style="text-align:center"|T-Mobile ArenaParadise, NV
|-

Honors
 February 3, 2020 – Jaime Jaquez Jr. was selected as Pac-12 Freshman of the Week.
 February 24, 2020 - Tyger Campbell was selected as Pac-12 Freshman of the Week.
 March 9, 2020 – Head coach Mick Cronin was named the Pac-12 Coach of the Year; Chris Smith, Jr was named Pac-12 Most Improved Player of the Year and first-team All-Pac-12.

References

External links

2019–20 UCLA Bruins Roster and Stats at Sports-Reference.com

UCLA Bruins men's basketball seasons
UCLA
UCLA Bruins basketball, men
UCLA Bruins basketball, men
UCLA Bruins basketball, men
UCLA Bruins basketball, men